Strophocheilus is a genus of gastropods belonging to the family Strophocheilidae.

The species of this genus are found in Southern America.

Species:

Strophocheilus calus 
Strophocheilus chubutensis 
Strophocheilus debilis 
Strophocheilus groeberi 
Strophocheilus miersi 
Strophocheilus ovatus
Strophocheilus pudicus 
Strophocheilus tenuis

References

Gastropods